Hugh Duncan Griffiths, FRS, FREng is a British electronic engineer. He is known for his contributions in radar research, especially in bistatic radar and passive radar.

Career and research 
He has published over 550 research papers in journals and conference proceedings.
Books include Modern Antennas (Springer, 2005), Advances in Bistatic Radar (Scitech, 2007), Radar Automatic Target Recognition and Non-Cooperative Target Recognition (IET, 2013), An Introduction to Passive Radar (Artech House, 2017 – also published in Chinese, second edition 2022).

 Since 1982 he has served as Editor-in-Chief of the IET Radar, Sonar and Navigation journal.

 In 2017 he was appointed Chair of the Defence Science Expert Committee (DSEC) in the UK Ministry of Defence. He is a member of the Home Office Science Advisory Council (HOSAC).

Awards and honours

References 

Living people
Year of birth missing (living people)
Fellows of the Royal Society
Fellows of the Royal Academy of Engineering
Order of the British Empire
20th-century British engineers
21st-century British engineers
British electrical engineers
People associated with radar
Scientific journal editors